Christian Hageseth is an entrepreneur, author, marijuana rights advocate and business owner. He was born in Pensacola, Florida and grew up in Fort Collins, Colorado. He  graduated from Arizona State University with a degree in Political Science in 1992. Hageseth is the founder of Green Man Cannabis, an award-winning marijuana cultivation and dispensary business in Denver, CO. He is also the founder of American Cannabis Partners (ACP), a cannabis business development firm which is developing the Colorado Cannabis Ranch. Hageseth is the author of Big Weed: An Entrepreneur's High Stakes Adventures in the Budding Legal Marijuana Business, published in 2015 by Macmillan.

Hageseth is an entrepreneur and father of four girls who worked in the white-collar world for 20 years before opening his first dispensary. Prior to opening his first dispensary, in 2009, he founded an ice cream business and several related real estate finance businesses. He has worked in the marijuana industry full-time since July 2009.

Author 
In 2015 Hageseth published his first book Big Weed: An Entrepreneur's High Stakes Adventures in the Budding Legal Marijuana Business (Macmillan, 2015) with co-author Joseph D’Agnese. Through Big Weed, Hageseth paints a picture of the evolution of legal marijuana, describing his journey from complete newcomer in 2009 to winning multiple Cannabis Cups (the industry's highest award for product excellence) and planning the Colorado Cannabis Ranch. He concludes the book with his predictions for the future of the industry, based on his own experience.

Entrepreneur

American Cannabis Partners 
Through American Cannabis Partners (ACP), Hageseth aims to grow the legal marijuana industry in a responsible way. He aims to connect like-minded teams and investors to make projects come alive. He is currently concentrating on the development of the Colorado Cannabis Ranch, the world's first "weedery". The Colorado Cannabis Ranch is scheduled to open in 2018. Hageseth has spoken at a number of industry events around the US and in Canada, often addressing the need for innovation in the industry and inspiring other entrepreneurs with accounts of his own entrepreneurial journey. He is also often sought out by the media as an industry source.

Colorado Cannabis Ranch 
The Colorado Cannabis Ranch is designed to be the world's first "weedery" – similar to the concept of a winery or brewery but for legal marijuana. Hageseth is currently developing this project through his company American Cannabis Partners. The aim of the Colorado Cannabis Ranch is to demystify and de-stigmatize legal cannabis, and also set new standards in cultivation. Hageseth envisions that the Ranch will allow visitors to tour a legal marijuana cultivation center for the first time. He also plans for an on-site restaurant and bar, and an amphitheater to be part of the experience.

Green Man Cannabis 
Hageseth founded Green Man Cannabis, a legal marijuana cultivation and retail business in 2009. Until 2015 Green Man Cannabis cultivated and sold medical marijuana only. In 2015 the company was licensed to cultivate and sell both medical and recreational marijuana. Green Man Cannabis has two retail locations in Denver, CO. The business has won multiple awards, including six High Times Cannabis Cups – the most prestigious award for product excellence.

Green Man Cannabis Awards 
2016 Cannabis Cup
 1st Place Colorado Sativa -Ghost Train Haze
 1st Place Colorado Hybrid -Star Killer
2015 THC Championship
 Grand Champion -Star Killer
 1st Place Recreational Hybrid -Motor Breath
 2nd Place Recreational Indica -Hell's OG
 2nd Place Recreational Sativa -Ghost Train Haze
 1st Place Medical Hybrid -Star Killer
 2nd Place Medical Sativa -Moonshine Haze
 Connoisseur's Choice - Best Tested- Motor Breath
 Best Tested- Hell's OG
 People's Choice - Connoisseur's Choice - Best Tested- Star Killer
 Best Tested -Moonshine Haze
2015 Cannabis Cup
 1st Place Colorado Sativa -Ghost Train Haze
 1st Place Colorado Indica -Louie OG
 2nd Place Colorado Hybrid -Star Killer
2015 Rooster Colorado Cup
 Grand Champion -Star Killer
 1st Place Hybrid -Star Killer
 1st Place Sativa -Ghost Train Haze
2014 THC Championship
 1st Place Medical Sativa– Ghost Train Haze
 1st Place Medical Indica– Hell's OG Kush
 1st Place Medical Hybrid– Star Killer
 Best Tested Medical Sativa – Ghost Train Haze
 Patient's Choice Medical Indica – Hell's OG Kush
 Best Tested Medical Indica – Hell's OG Kush
 Patient's Choice Medical Hybrid – Star Killer
2014 Cannabis Cup
 1st Place Sativa, Best Sativa in the US -Ghost Train Haze
2012 Cannabis Cup
 1st Place Hybrid - Skunkberry
2012 Rooster Colorado Cup
 1st Place Sativa - Jack Herer
 3rd Place Sativa - Super Lemon Haze
 3rd Place Indica - Hell's OG Kush

References 

Year of birth missing (living people)
Living people
People from Pensacola, Florida
American cannabis activists